Sweet Adeline may refer to:

"Sweet Adeline" (song), a 1903 ballad best known as a barbershop standard
Sweet Adeline (musical), a 1929 Broadway musical by Jerome Kern and Oscar Hammerstein II
Sweet Adeline (1934 film), a Warner Brothers film based on the Broadway musical
Sweet Adeline (1926 film), starring Charles Ray
"Sweet Adeline", a song by Elliott Smith from his album XO

See also

Sweet Adelines International, a worldwide organization of women singers of barbershop harmony